The House of Representatives is the elected lower house of the bicameral Parliament of Trinidad and Tobago, along with the President and Senate of Trinidad and Tobago. The House of Representatives sits at the Red House. It has 41 members, each elected to represent single-seat constituencies. The Parliament is elected with a five-year term, but may be dissolved earlier by the President if so advised by the Prime Minister.

After an election, the person commanding the support of the most members of the House is appointed Prime Minister and asked to form a government.

Five constituencies were added in the 2007 election; there were only 36 constituencies prior to 2007. There are now 41 constituencies.

The Presiding Officer of the House of Representatives is the Speaker of the House, who can either be one of the elected 41 members, or come from outside. This has implications for the calculation of special majority votes (42 members instead of 41).

As of 20 April 2021, there are only 12 female members (28.6%), and three members born in Tobago (7.3%).

Election 2020

Current members of Parliament

Speaker of the House of Representatives

The current members of Parliament are listed below based on the results of the 2020 general election:

Notes and references

See also
Parliament of Trinidad and Tobago
Senate of Trinidad and Tobago
Elections in Trinidad and Tobago
List of political parties in Trinidad and Tobago
List of speakers of the House of Representatives of Trinidad and Tobago 
Politics of Trinidad and Tobago

External links
 

Government of Trinidad and Tobago
Politics of Trinidad and Tobago
Political organisations based in Trinidad and Tobago
Trinidad and Tobago